Cigeľ is a village and municipality in Prievidza District in the Trenčín Region of western Slovakia.

History
In historical records the village was first mentioned in 1362.

Geography
The municipality lies at an altitude of 460 metres and covers an area of 17.35 km². It has a population of about 1,036 people.

Gallery

Genealogical resources

The records for genealogical research are available at the state archive "Statny Archiv in Nitra, Slovakia"

 Roman Catholic church records (births/marriages/deaths): 1660-1895 (parish B)

See also
 List of municipalities and towns in Slovakia

References

External links

 
www.cigel.host.sk
Surnames of living people in Cigel

Villages and municipalities in Prievidza District